The 2016 AFL season was the 120th season in the Australian Football League contested by the Sydney Swans.

Club summary
After having split its home games between the Sydney Cricket Ground and ANZ Stadium since 2002, Sydney returned to playing all games at the Sydney Cricket Ground. The club and the stadium had originally planned to end their agreement at the end of the 2016 season, but the two parties agreed on February 29 to end the agreement one year early. The three 2016 matches which were scheduled for ANZ Stadium (Round 1 vs , Round 7 vs  and Round 18 vs ) were shifted to the Sydney Cricket Ground as a result. Under the club's new stadium arrangement, it has committed to playing all home games at the Sydney Cricket Ground in a thirty-year deal, set to end in 2046.

On 12 April 2016, the Swans broke the 50,000 members milestone for the first time, breaking the club's record of 48,836 members set in 2015.

Squad for 2016
Statistics are correct as of end of 2015 season.
Flags represent the state of origin, i.e. the state in which the player played his Under-18s football.

For players: (c) denotes captain, (vc) denotes vice-captain, (lg) denotes leadership group.
For coaches: (s) denotes senior coach, (cs) denotes caretaker senior coach, (a) denotes assistant coach, (d) denotes development coach.

Playing list changes

The following summarises all player changes between the conclusion of the 2015 season and the beginning of the 2016 season.

In

Out

List management

Season summary

Pre-season matches

Home and away season

Finals matches

Ladder

Individual awards and records

Bob Skilton Medal

Rising Star Award: Callum Mills

Dennis Carroll Trophy for Most Improved Player: Aliir Aliir

Barry Round Shield for Best Clubman: Alex Johnson

Paul Kelly Players’ Player: Lance Franklin

Paul Roos Award for Best Player in a Finals Series: Heath Grundy & Josh Kennedy

All-Australian Team

Milestones

Debuts

1Had previously played for another club but played their first match for the Sydney Swans.

AFL Rising Star

Reserves

Regular season

Finals series

Ladder

References

Sydney Swans seasons
Sydney